Joseph Gerald Gallagher (born in London 4 May 1964) is a British-born Swiss chess player and writer. He was awarded the title of Grandmaster by FIDE in 1990 and has been the national champion of both Britain and Switzerland.

Career
Born to Irish parents Norah and Patrick, Gallagher was the eldest child (his sisters Catherine, Noreen, Pauline and Marie, and brother Stephen also played chess). His sister Marie also played chess to an international standard at age 11. He played for many years on the European chess circuit, before marrying and moving to Neuchâtel in Switzerland, taking Swiss nationality, being awarded the title of Grandmaster in 1990, and then winning the British Chess Championship in 2001 and the Swiss Chess Championship in 1997, 1998, 2004, 2005, 2007, 2012 and 2021.

He has represented his adopted country Switzerland regularly at the Chess Olympiad and at the European Team Chess Championship since 1997, his best result occurring at the 2006 Chess Olympiad, when he scored 6/10.

Gallagher is a noted author on various aspects of chess opening theory, being an expert on the King's Indian Defence as Black and the King's Gambit as White. Gallagher was one of four writers of the popular volume Nunn's Chess Openings (Everyman Chess 1999).

Books

References

 – middle name.

External links
 Joseph G Gallagher games at 365Chess.com
 

1964 births
Living people
Chess grandmasters
Chess Olympiad competitors
English chess players
Swiss chess players
Swiss non-fiction writers
Swiss male writers
British chess writers
Place of birth missing (living people)
Male non-fiction writers